The Tulane Building is a historic building in Montgomery, Alabama, U.S.. It was built from 1904 to 1908 by Victor Tulane, a black businessman who was a trustee of the Tuskegee Institute. Booker T. Washington visited the Tulane in the building in 1908. It has been listed on the National Register of Historic Places since March 21, 1979.

References

National Register of Historic Places in Alabama
Buildings and structures completed in 1908
Buildings and structures in Montgomery, Alabama
1908 establishments in Alabama